A Treatise on Probability  is a book published by John Maynard Keynes while at Cambridge University in 1921.  The Treatise attacked the classical theory of probability and proposed a "logical-relationist" theory instead. In a 1922 review, Bertrand Russell, the co-author of Principia Mathematica, called it "undoubtedly the most important work on probability that has appeared for a very long time," and said that the "book as a whole is one which it is impossible to praise too highly."

The Treatise is fundamentally philosophical in nature despite extensive mathematical formulations.  The Treatise presented an approach to probability that was more subject to variation with evidence than the highly quantified classical version. Keynes's conception of probability is that it is a strictly logical relation between evidence and hypothesis, a degree of partial implication. Keynes's Treatise is the classic account of the logical interpretation of probability (or probabilistic logic), a view of probability that has been continued by such later works as Carnap's Logical Foundations of Probability and E.T. Jaynes Probability Theory: The Logic of Science.

Keynes saw numerical probabilities as special cases of probability, which did not have to be quantifiable or even comparable.

Keynes, in chapter 3 of the "A Treatise on Probability", used the example of taking an umbrella in case of rain to express the idea of uncertainty that he dealt with by the use of interval estimates in chapters 3, 15, 16, and 17 of the "A Treatise on Probability". Intervals that overlap are not greater than, less than or equal to each other. They can't be compared. 
Is our expectation of rain, when we start out for a walk, always more likely than not, or less likely than not, or as likely as not? I am prepared to argue that on some occasions none of these alternatives hold, and that it will be an arbitrary matter to decide for or against the umbrella. If the barometer is high, but the clouds are black, it is not always rational that one should prevail over the other in our minds, or even that we should balance them, though it will be rational to allow caprice to determine us and to waste no time on the debate.

References

Keynesian economics
Probability books
1921 non-fiction books
Books by John Maynard Keynes
Macmillan Publishers books
Treatises